Delia Reinhardt (27 April 1892 – 6 October 1974) was a German operatic soprano.

Life 
Born in Elberfeld, Reinhardt was a student of Ludwig Strakosch and his wife Hedwig Schako at the Hoch Conservatory in Frankfurt.

She made her debut in Breslau in 1913 as a "messenger of peace" in Rienzi and stayed there until 1916. From 1916 to 1922/1923 she was at the Bavarian State Opera at the invitation of Bruno Walter. From 1922/1923 she was then at the Metropolitan Opera in New York. There, she made her debut as "Sieglinde" in the Walküre and appeared in a total of ten great roles, among others as "Elisabeth" in Tannhäuser, as "Agathe", as "Butterfly", as "Fiordiligi" and as "Gita" in Massent's Le roi de Lahore. 

Returning to Europe, she was a member of the ensemble of the Berlin State Opera from 1924 to 1935. In 1929, she was the "Pamina" in The Magic Flute in the opening performance of the Staatsoper, which was reopened after a renovation, in the presence of the Reich President Paul von Hindenburg.

Guest performances took her to the London Covent Garden (1924-29), to the opera houses of Copenhagen, Budapest, Amsterdam and Brussels, to Italian and Spanish theatres, to the Städtische Oper Berlin. In 1931 she had a guest performance at the Teatro Colón in Buenos Aires in Wagner roles.

For political reasons she could not perform in Germany after 1937. She lived in Berlin until the end of the Second World War, but lost her entire house there in a bombing raid and then went to Bavaria.

Bruno Walter invited her to move her residence to Santa Monica. After Walter's death in 1962, she moved to Dornach in Switzerland. After she had ended her career as a singer, she worked as an artist.

Reinhardt was first married to the baritone Gustav Schützendorf (1883-1937) and in her second marriage to the conductor Georges Sébastian.

Reinhardt died in Arlesheim near Basel at the age of 82.

Literature 
 K. J. Kutsch, Leo Riemens: Großes Sängerlexikon. Unchanged edition. K. G. Saur, Bern, 1993, second volume M–Z, p. 243;f., .

External links 
 
 Reinhardt (Schützendorf), Delia on BMLO
 Reinhardt Delia on OPERISSIMO

1892 births
1974 deaths
People from Elberfeld
German operatic sopranos
German women painters
German emigrants to Switzerland
German emigrants to the United States
20th-century German  women opera singers
20th-century German painters
20th-century German women artists
Musicians from Wuppertal